Abutilon pitcairnense, the yellow fatu or yellow fautu, is a critically endangered perennial plant that is native to Pitcairn Island. It was once considered extinct, until a single plant was discovered on the island in 2003. At that time, cuttings and seed were used to propagate several plants at a nursery on the island and botanical gardens in Ireland and England. The last wild surviving plant died in a landslide in 2005, making the plant extinct in the wild.

Description
The plant is native to unstable slopes, flowering from July to August.

Conservation and habitat
After being considered extinct for twenty years, a single plant was found growing in native forest of Homalium taypau and Metrosideros collina in 2003. Vegetative propagation, along with seed from the plant, were used to establish a small population on the island's nursery, with some propagation material also being sent to Trinity College Botanic Gardens, Dublin. A landslide killed the only wild plant in 2005, making the plant extinct in the wild. Cuttings from the Trinity College collection were taken to the National Botanic Gardens of Ireland, Glasnevin in 2007, and later to the Royal Botanical Gardens, Kew.

The forest where the plant is native is threatened by invasive species, with the Homalium taypau trees under competition from Syzygium jambos and Lantana camara. Chemical control of the invasive plants, along with reintroduction of native species, have had some success. As of 2011, there are plans to attempt the reintroduction of Abutilon pitcairnense to the island. There are also plans for a more thorough search of the island for surviving native plants during July and August, the flowering season of Abutilon pitcairnense.

Taxonomy
Abutilon pitcairnense was discovered in 1934 by two American botanists, Harold St. John and Francis Raymond Fosberg, and named after the island.

References

Further resources
 
 
 

pitcairnense
Plants extinct in the wild
Flora of the Pitcairn Islands
Critically endangered flora of Oceania